The following lists events that happened during 1949 in the Union of Soviet Socialist Republics.

Incumbents
 General Secretary of the Communist Party of the Soviet Union – Joseph Stalin
 Chairman of the Presidium of the Supreme Soviet of the Soviet Union – Nikolay Shvernik
 Chairman of the Council of Ministers of the Soviet Union – Joseph Stalin

Events

January
 25 January – The Council for Mutual Economic Assistance (CMEA or COMECON) is established by the Soviet Union and other communist nations.
 c. 29 January – Stalin and antisemitism: The Soviet media resume a savage propaganda campaign against "rootless cosmopolitans", a euphemism for Soviet Jews, accusing them of being pro-Western and antisocialist

March
 25–28 March – Operation Priboi

May
 12 May – Cold War: The Soviet Union lifts the Berlin Blockade

July
 10 July – 1949 Khait earthquake

August
 29 August – The atomic bomb RDS-1 is exploded in the first Soviet nuclear test

September
 13 September – The Soviet Union vetoes United Nations membership for Ceylon, Finland, Iceland, Italy, Jordan and Portugal

October
 2 October – The Soviet Union recognizes the People's Republic of China, proclaimed on the previous day

November
 7 November – Oil is discovered beneath the Caspian Sea, off the coast of the Azerbaijan Soviet Socialist Republic

December
 25–31 December – Khabarovsk War Crime Trials

Births
 29 January – Evgeny Lovchev, footballer
 25 February – Viktor Klimenko, Olympic gymnast
 26 February – Viktor Ulyanich, boxer
 17 March – Pavel Palazhchenko, interpreter
 12 June – Yuri Baturin, cosmonaut
 3 July – Aleksandr Salnikov, basketball player
 3 August – Valeri Vasiliev, hockey player
 18 September – Gennady Komnatov, cyclist
 23 September – Elena Guskova, historian
 2 October – Alexander Aksinin, painter
 28 October – Volodymyr Onyshchenko, footballer
 21 November
 Elena Mikhailovskaya, female draughts player
 Anatoliy Kuksov, footballer
 23 November – Viktor Poganovsky, Olympic equestrian

See also
 1949 in fine arts of the Soviet Union
 List of Soviet films of 1949

References

 
1940s in the Soviet Union
Years in the Soviet Union
Soviet Union
Soviet Union
Soviet Union